To Lose My Life... (also known by extended title of To Lose My Life or Lose My Love, or shortened as To Lose My Life) is the debut album by the British indie rock band White Lies. It was released on 19 January 2009 by Fiction Records. The album was produced by Ed Buller and Max Dingel, and was recorded at ICP Studios in Belgium and Kore Studios in London.

The album produced four singles: "Unfinished Business", "Death" and "To Lose My Life", prior to its release, and "Farewell to the Fairground" in the months following. "Death" was reissued in June 2009, with "From the Stars" appearing as iTunes's "Single of the Week" during December 2008. The album was released in the United States on 17 March 2009.

History and production
The album was recorded at ICP Studios in Brussels, Belgium, and Kore Studios, Acton, west London. It was produced by Ed Buller and Max Dingel, who previously worked with Suede, the Killers and Glasvegas. Further mixing was completed by Alan Moulder. The album featured a 20-piece orchestra, later stated as a 25-piece, arranged by Buller. Upon entering the studio, the band only had five early demo versions of tracks "Death", "E.S.T.", "Farewell to the Fairground", "From the Stars" and "Unfinished Business"; the rest of the songs were written and recorded during studio time.

Promotion and release
On 22 September 2008, the band played nine of the 10 released tracks at Manchester's Night and Day Café. Reviewing the gig, NME described the album by its provisional title of To Lose My Life or Lose My Love.

The album was released on 19 January 2009 in the United Kingdom on CD and 12-inch vinyl, as well as in a number of other limited-edition forms, including one housed in a green cardboard box. Pre-orders bought from online retailer Play.com were packaged in a slipcase exclusive to that website, while the iTunes Store released the album with a number of bonus tracks and remixes previously only found as B-sides. White Lies' official website packaged the first 500 purchases with a green companion booklet, containing studio pictures and individual essays written by members of the band and production team. The site also published the album in a deluxe boxset, which contained the album on six 7-inch vinyl discs, along with an extra 7" containing demo versions of "The Price of Love" and "Nothing to Give". On 13 February 2009, the band announced the release of an instrumental version of the album, free with iTunes and physical purchases. The album's artwork was nominated alongside 49 others for Best Art Vinyl 2009 by website Artvinyl.com. Finishing seventh in the overall poll, the artwork was displayed in multiple exhibitions in Birmingham and London during November 2009.

On 17 April 2010, the band released The Remixes, an EP containing remixes of songs from To Lose My Life.... The five-track EP was limited to 500 copies and released as part of Record Store Day 2009.

Reception

Critical
Initial critical response for To Lose My Life... was mixed. At Metacritic, which assigns a normalized rating out of 100 to reviews from mainstream critics, the album has received an average score of 58, based on 17 reviews.

Chart performance 
To Lose My Life... debuted at No. 1 on the UK Albums Chart, making White Lies the first British act in 2009 to achieve a No. 1 album. It was the first 2009 album to debut at No. 1. Worldwide, the album charted in 11 countries, including six top 40 positions in Europe.

Track listing

Personnel

White Lies
 Harry McVeigh – lead vocals, guitar
 Charles Cave – bass guitar, backing vocals
 Jack Lawrence-Brown – drums

Additional personnel
 Ed Buller – production
 Max Dingel – production

Charts and certifications

Weekly charts

Year-end charts

Certifications

References

White Lies (band) albums
Albums produced by Ed Buller
2009 debut albums
Fiction Records albums
Geffen Records albums